Cloyd A. Porter (born May 22, 1935) is a retired American Republican politician.  He was a member of the Wisconsin State Assembly for 28 years (1973–2001), representing Burlington, Wisconsin, and nearby towns in eastern Walworth County and western Racine and Kenosha counties.

Biography
Porter was born on in Huntley, Illinois. He graduated from Burlington High School in Burlington, Wisconsin. Porter is married with four adult children.

Career
Porter had a career in the trucking business before seeking elected office. He served a short time as Burlington Town Chairman before being elected to the Assembly in 1972.  He announced his retirement in 2000.

References

People from Huntley, Illinois
People from Burlington, Wisconsin
Republican Party members of the Wisconsin State Assembly
1935 births
Living people